Wallach Hall is the second oldest residence hall (or dormitory) on the campus of Columbia University, and currently houses undergraduate students from Columbia College as well as the Fu Foundation School of Engineering and Applied Science. It opened in 1905 as "Livingston Hall" after Robert Livingston, a Founding Father of the United States and alumnus of King's College, Columbia's predecessor, but its name was changed after Ira D. Wallach donated approximately $2 million towards its renovation. This gave rise to the joke, "Livingston signed the Declaration of Independence, Wallach signed a check." (Although a member of the committee of the Continental Congress that drafted the Declaration, Livingston did not actually sign the historic document.)

The building was home, among others, to Bhimrao Ramji Ambedkar, an Indian jurist, political leader, philosopher, anthropologist, historian, orator, prolific writer, economist, scholar, editor, a revolutionary and one of the founding fathers of independent India. Ambedkar received a Baroda State Scholarship of 11.50 British pounds per month for three years in 1913 to join the Politics Department of Columbia University as a postgraduate student.

Wallach Hall was also home to Beat Generation author Jack Kerouac. In his autobiography Vanity of Duluoz he expressed his satisfaction with the move from neighboring Hartley Hall:

One great move I made was to switch my dormitory room from Hartley Hall to Livingston Hall where there were no cockroaches and where b'God I had a room all to myself, on the second floor, overlooking the beautiful trees and walkways of the campus and overlooking, to my greatest delight, besides the Van Am Quadrangle, the library itself, the new one, with its stone frieze running around entire with the names engraved in stone forever: "Goethe ... Voltaire ... Shakespeare ... Molière ... Dante." That was more like it. Lighting my fragrant pipe at 8 P.M., I'd open the pages of my homework, turn on station WQXR for the continual classical music, and sit there, in the golden glow of my lamp, in a sweater, sight and say, "Well, now I'm a real collegian at last."
Overhauled during the early 1980s, Wallach is currently, with Hartley, part of the Living and Learning Center (LLC), home to suite-style housing that intermingles all class levels and features interactive events designed to draw them together. An application process is required to obtain housing in either of the LLC dormitories.

Notable residents

 Robert Mountsier, author, journalist and literary agent
Jacques Barzun, professor, recipient of the Presidential Medal of Freedom
Isadora Cerullo, Olympic rugby sevens player
Andrew Sarris, film critic 
Jack Kerouac, Beat Generation author
Joel Klein, former New York City Schools Chancellor
Eric Foner, Pulitzer Prize-winning professor of history
Janice Min, head of Us Weekly, The Hollywood Reporter and Billboard
Melvin I. Urofsky, American historian
Nico Muhly, American music composer
Allen Young, American writer, journalist
Robert A. M. Stern, American architect, former dean of the Yale School of Architecture
Jason Epstein, publisher, co-founder of The New York Review of Books
Hal Chase, archeologist, member of the Beat Generation
John Giorno, poet, ex-lover of Andy Warhol

References

External links

Wallach Hall at Columbia Housing
Photo Tour of Wallach Hall
Housing the Columbia Community, lecture by Professor Andrew S. Dolkart on October 5, 1999
Home on the Heights: 100 Years of Housing at Columbia by Michael Foss, Columbia College Today, September 2005

University and college dormitories in the United States
Columbia University dormitories